Middle Peak may refer to:

Middle Peak (Colorado), in the San Miguel Mountains, United States
Middle Peak (Nevada), United States
Middle Peak (Washington), in the North Cascades, US

See also
 Middle Triple Peak, in the Kichatna Mountains, Alaska, United States